Early Whitney is an EP by American hip hop artist Why?. It was released by Anticon on October 6, 2003, four months after Why?'s second studio album Oaklandazulasylum.

It is named after the song of the same name from Oaklandazulasylum, which is also included on the EP itself. It also contains several songs that later appeared on the live album Almost Live from Anna's Cabin.

It is the final solo release on which Yoni Wolf would use the stage name 'Why?', transferring it onto his newly founded band in 2004.

Track listing

References

External links
 

Why? (American band) albums
2003 EPs
Anticon EPs